Probable G-protein coupled receptor 149 is a protein that in humans is encoded by the GPR149 gene.

References

G protein-coupled receptors